Mayara is a Portuguese female given name. It may also refer to:

 Mayara Magri (actress) (born 1962), Brazilian actress
 Mayara Moura (born 1986), Brazilian handball player
 Mayara (footballer, born 1987), Mayara da Fonseca Bordin, Brazilian football midfielder
 Mayara Magri (dancer) (born 1994), Brazilian ballet dancer
 Natália Mayara (born 1994), Brazilian wheelchair tennis player
 Mayara (footballer, born 2001), Mayara Nabosne Harendt, Brazilian football goalkeeper

Portuguese feminine given names